Epipsestis medialis is a moth in the family Drepanidae. It is found in Nepal.

The wingspan is 34–37 mm. The forewings are pale grey, with its median area dark blackish grey. The hindwings are pale whitish grey.

References

Moths described in 1982
Thyatirinae